{{Infobox radio station
| name             = KMLO
| logo             = KMLO logo.jpg
| city             = Lowry, South Dakota
| area             = Mobridge, South Dakota
| branding         = Everything Country| frequency        = 100.7 MHz
| airdate          = 
| format           = Country
| erp              = 100,000 watts
| haat             = 
| class            = C1
| facility_id      = 30210
| coordinates      = 
| callsign_meaning = Mobridge sister station to KPLO-FM
| former_callsigns = KKFX
| affiliations     = ABC News Radio
| owner            = Ingstad Family Media
| licensee         = James River Broadcasting Company
| sister_stations  = KGFX, KGFX-FM, KJBI, KOLY, KOLY-FM, KPLO-FM
| webcast          = Listen Live
| website          = dakotaradiogroup.com 
}}
KMLO (100.7 FM, "Everything Country") is a radio station licensed to serve Lowry, South Dakota, United States.  The station is owned by James River Broadcasting. It airs a country music format.

All three Mobridge DRG Media Group (James River Broadcasting) stations share studios on 3rd St. East, in Mobridge. The KMLO transmitter and  tower are southeast of town, off Route 83.

The station was assigned the KMLO call letters by the Federal Communications Commission on October 18, 1986.

Programming
Notable syndicated programming includes “The Big Time” with Whitney Allen and 'and CT40 with Fitz'' on weekends.

References

External links
KMLO official website

MLO
Country radio stations in the United States
Walworth County, South Dakota
Radio stations established in 1986
1986 establishments in South Dakota